WPCW (channel 19), branded on-air as Pittsburgh's CW, is a television station licensed to Jeannette, Pennsylvania, United States, serving as the CW affiliate for the Pittsburgh area. It is owned by the CBS News and Stations group alongside CBS owned-and-operated station KDKA-TV (channel 2). Both stations share studios at the Gateway Center in downtown Pittsburgh, while WPCW's transmitter is located in the city's Perry North neighborhood.

By way of extended cable coverage, WPCW also served as the default CW affiliate for the Johnstown–Altoona–State College television market, until WJAC-TV's September 16, 2019 conversion of its fourth digital subchannel into a CW+ affiliate (known as Alleghenies CW6), as that area lacked a CW affiliate of its own until then. WPCW was a Johnstown station for most of its history. The CW-affiliated superstation WPIX in New York also continues to be carried on Xfinity in State College, even though WJAC-DT4 is relayed into that area over WJAC's State College based translator, W42DG-D.

History

As WARD-TV (1953–1970)
WPCW signed on the air on October 15, 1953, as WARD-TV on analog UHF channel 56, with studios on Franklin Street in downtown Johnstown. It operated at a power of 91,000 watts visual, and 45,500 watts aural power, which, as it was later learned in these experimental days of UHF, was rather low for a UHF station. It was co-owned by Central Broadcasting through its Rivoli Realty subsidiary along with WARD radio (1490 AM, now WNTJ, and 92.1 FM, now WJHT). The station was the area's CBS affiliate with a secondary ABC affiliation. During the late-1950s, it was also briefly affiliated with the NTA Film Network.

As WJNL-TV (1971–1982)
On March 22, 1971, Jonel Construction Company bought WARD-AM-FM-TV and changed their calls to WJNL-AM-FM-TV the following year, doing business as Cover Broadcasting, Inc. Having been issued a construction permit to do so in 1969, the television station then moved to the stronger UHF channel 19 and dropped ABC programming. The channel move also brought a transmitter power increase to 215,000 watts visual, and 21,500 watts aural.

Jonel also left the Franklin Street studio for a new facility located on Benshoff Hill, not too far from the transmitter atop Cover Hill in suburban Johnstown. The radio stations moved to the Benshoff Hill location in 1977, after the Franklin Street studios were destroyed in a massive flood.

Even with the move to the stronger channel 19 and its substantial power increase, WJNL-TV was still plagued by a weak signal. Most of Western Pennsylvania is a very rugged dissected plateau. At the time, UHF stations usually did not get good reception in rugged terrain. This left the station dependent on cable–then as now, all but essential for acceptable television in much of this market. In fact, Johnstown viewers got better signals from WFBG-TV (channel 10) in Altoona and KDKA-TV in Pittsburgh. After WFBG-TV was sold in 1973, that station changed its callsign to WTAJ-TV in part to acknowledge its Johnstown viewership (its call letters stand for "We're Television for Altoona and Johnstown"). As a result, WJNL-TV never thrived, and was more or less a non-factor in a market dominated by WJAC-TV (channel 6). It only stayed afloat because of the tremendous success of its FM sister, an adult contemporary powerhouse.

In 1978, WJNL-TV dropped its affiliation with CBS and became an independent station. Forced to buy an additional 19 hours of programming a day, its ratings plummeted even further.

As WFAT and WPTJ (1983–1991)
Channel 19 was sold on February 1, 1983, to WFAT Incorporated, a company headed by Leon Crosby, a former owner of the original KEMO-TV (now KOFY-TV) in San Francisco, and renamed WFAT-TV. Crosby also had an ownership interest in WPGH-TV in neighboring Pittsburgh from 1973 to 1978, in addition to serving as that station's president and general manager. Under the direction of Crosby, who had gained a favorable reputation from successfully turning around failing stations, the new WFAT-TV underwent a substantial technical overhaul intended to overcome its years-long stigma of poor signal reception.

With the move came its largest power increase yet to 1.6 million watts visual, and 166,000 watts aural. This enabled the station to provide a grade B signal to Pittsburgh's eastern suburbs; indeed, the new transmitter was located within the Pittsburgh market. The new transmitter finally provided city-grade coverage to all of Johnstown, allowing many viewers who had struggled to watch the station over-the-air for 30 years to get a clear picture for the first time. It also allowed the station to introduce itself to viewers in the Pittsburgh area. However, it still had a problem attracting Altoona viewers due to the mountainous terrain separating the two cities, resulting in marginal reception at best on the eastern side of the market. Crosby addressed this by signing on a VHF translator (W12BR) in Altoona. The changes did little to improve the station's fortunes, largely because the major Pittsburgh independents had long been available on cable.

While WFAT now had a fairly decent signal in most of the market, it had comparatively little to offer. At the time of the change, WJNL-TV had a mixture of independent and religious programs; the relaunch saw it extend its broadcast day from 8 hours to 13. It was one of the few stations, even in small markets, that still used art cards rather than CGI technology. Its character generator had been in service for over three decades, dating to when the station was WARD-TV. Its microphones were second-class. Crosby's formula of turning weak stations around by producing local shows with young creative talent was no longer viable for WFAT-TV, as such shows were losing ground to syndicators now offering much cheaper alternatives that could be tailor-made for specific markets. The very few locally produced programs WFAT now had left were limited to discussion-based talk shows on simple, undecorated sets with little more than chairs and carpet. David Smith and Lee Mack (the former had been program director of WJNL radio) served as the station's booth announcers.

Decline and bankruptcy (1986–1990)
WFAT's fortunes suffered a crippling blow in 1986, when the owners of the construction permit for WWCP-TV (channel 8) were allowed to move the license from Pittsburgh to Johnstown. WWCP signed on in 1987 and took most of WFAT's stronger shows due to having the advantage of a stronger VHF signal. The station changed calls to WPTJ in 1988 and moved its studios to Allen Bill Drive in the Johnstown Industrial Park, but saw no change in its fortunes. Frequent transmitter problems often left the station off-the-air for extended periods of time.

Crosby filed for Chapter 11 bankruptcy in 1988, and in January 1990, the bankruptcy court ordered its conversion to a Chapter 7 liquidation. WPTJ remained on the air for almost five months after the conversion. However, on May 1, all of the station's staffers except assistant general manager Ron Patcher quit after not being paid for four weeks. Patcher spent the next five days keeping the station operating. However, he quit on May 6 after concluding the load of working 18-hour days was "too much," and WPTJ went silent.

Return as WTWB-TV (1994–1997)

Meanwhile, over in Pittsburgh, Venture Technologies Group had signed on low-power station W29AH (channel 29) in 1989 with the Video Jukebox Network, later known as The Box. However, five years later, Venture saw opportunity. Pittsburgh was the largest market without a signed affiliate of The WB, and it snagged the affiliation for its low-power station. At the same time, Venture purchased the silent WPTJ at a bankruptcy auction for less than $1 million. Channel 29 became WTWB-LP and then WBPA-LP, while channel 19 was given the new call letters WTWB-TV and plans were announced for the two to form a simulcast.

On July 27, 1996, Venture reactivated the channel 19 facility under the WTWB-TV calls, operating from a new transmitter on Laurel Mountain west of Jennerstown. However, cable systems in Pittsburgh were not required to carry channel 19 because it was licensed to Johnstown, located in a separate media market. As a result, after claiming that Johnstown–Altoona could not support five TV stations, Venture won permission to move WTWB-TV's city of license to Jeannette, an eastern suburb of Pittsburgh. Since WTWB-TV was now a Pittsburgh-market station, Venture could now invoke must-carry protection.

As WNPA (1997–2006)
By the time WTWB-TV had been approved to move to Jeannette, however, more than the city of license was changing. Sinclair Broadcast Group secured a group deal with The WB to change several of its stations to that network, including WPTT (channel 22), which became WCWB. Just as cable systems in the Pittsburgh metro area began adding channel 19, it began the fall TV season as an independent under new WNPA call letters. The UPN affiliation moved to channel 19 in January.

Viacom's Paramount Stations Group bought the station in November 1998 for $39 million, a significant return on Venture's original investment in 1994. It became a sister station to KDKA-TV after the company merged with CBS in 2000. Viacom consolidated WNPA's operations into KDKA-AM-TV's studios at One Gateway Center by 2001. WNPA began to identify on air as "UPN Pittsburgh" in late 2003 due to the fact that various cable providers in the area carry the station on different channels.

As WPCW (2006–present)
On January 24, 2006, Time Warner and CBS Corporation announced that The WB and UPN would shut down and be replaced by a new network called The CW, which would initially feature series from both predecessor networks along with newer programs. To coincide with this change, the station changed its call sign to WPCW and rebranded itself as "Pittsburgh's CW" in August. The network launched on September 18, 2006.

This provided city-grade coverage to Johnstown and "rimshot" coverage to Pittsburgh. As a result, it was barely viewable over-the-air in many low-lying areas in the northern and western parts of the city and could not be seen at all in the city's western suburbs. It successfully contended that there was no way it could build an analog tower within the 15-mile limit without interfering with WOIO in Cleveland. However, WPCW built its digital transmitter in Pittsburgh's Perry North section, on some of the highest ground in the city. On June 12, 2009, coinciding with the national transition to digital television, WPCW turned off its analog transmitter near Jennerstown and began broadcasting its digital signal from its new transmitter in Pittsburgh.

The relocation of WPCW's transmitter now provides Pittsburgh with city-grade coverage, in addition to greater coverage west of the city, but has left many viewers east of Westmoreland County (who were able to pick up WPCW's analog signal) without a viewable signal. However, few, if any, viewers lost access to WPCW's programming. For years, CBS has fed a direct fiber signal to both Comcast and Verizon FiOS. Additionally, WPCW signed on a translator in Johnstown to retain coverage to that area and still includes Johnstown as part of its station identification despite WJAC-TV having since added The CW Plus to one of its digital subchannels on channel 6.4. WPCW is one of three former CBS affiliates that have since become CW stations owned by CBS, along with WTVX in West Palm Beach, Florida and KSTW in Seattle. However, WTVX was later divested to Cerberus Capital Management's Four Points Media Group (the Four Points Media stations are now owned by the Sinclair Broadcast Group, which owns Pittsburgh stations WPGH-TV and WPNT).

As CBS has done with most of its other CBS/CW duopolies in other markets, WPCW's web address has been folded within the KDKA website with only basic station and programming information, along with entertainment news and promotional video from The CW.

On December 4, 2019, CBS Corporation and Viacom remerged into ViacomCBS (now Paramount Global).

Programming

Sports programming
WPCW usually televises about six Pittsburgh Penguins games a year to allow Root Sports Pittsburgh (the team's usual broadcasting partner) to fulfill its national commitments to Fox Sports Networks' Pac-12 and ACC college football television packages. In 2010, WPCW broadcast the entire home schedule of the California University of Pennsylvania Vulcan Football season under the "Vulcan Sports Network" moniker.

WPCW and KDKA-TV serve as the area's official Pittsburgh Steelers stations and air several team-related shows. This includes Steelers Saturday Night on Saturday nights from 9 to 10 and Steelers TV on Saturday nights from 11 to 11:30 (hosted by Tunch Ilkin and Steelers Digest editor Bob Labriola) during the NFL season. Depending on CBS' weekly doubleheader schedule, the Extra Point airs on WPCW right after a Steelers game. That program is hosted by Bob Pompeani and Chris Hoke. The Nightly Sports Call airs every night from 10:35 to 11 after the KDKA-TV-produced prime time newscast. Weeknights are anchored by Bob Pompeani while weekends feature Rich Walsh. Depending on the doubleheader schedule, there is a special edition that is shown during the season after the Extra Point.

Newscasts

As WJNL-TV in Johnstown, it did produce a local newscast from 1971 to 1974 on weekdays and a few public affairs programs to try to compete against WJAC. However, its facilities were below the standards expected for a network affiliate. In August 2001 as WNPA, the station began to carry a prime time newscast every night at 10 produced by KDKA (currently known as The KDKA-TV 10 O'Clock News on The CW since September 2006). The 35-minute newscast competes with a nightly newscast at 10 p.m. on Fox affiliate WPGH-TV that is produced by WPXI. On September 20, 2021, the station added a 12:30 p.m. rebroadcast of KDKA's noon newscast, co-branded with CBSN Pittsburgh (since rebranded CBS News Pittsburgh).

In 2005, the station debuted a two-hour extension of KDKA's weekday morning newscast airing from 7 to 9 a.m. This was later shortened to one hour amid poor ratings, but in 2019 the 8 a.m. hour was restored. On June 16, 2009, KDKA began broadcasting its local newscasts in high definition, starting with its weekday noon broadcast, with the introduction of a new set and weather center. KDKA was the last major Pittsburgh television station to begin airing newscasts in HD and the WPCW shows were included in the upgrade.

Technical information

Subchannels
The station's digital signal is multiplexed:

Analog-to-digital conversion
WPCW shut down its analog signal, over UHF channel 19, on June 12, 2009, the official date in which full-power television stations in the United States transitioned from analog to digital broadcasts under federal mandate. The station moved its digital signal from its pre-transition UHF channel 49 (where its digital signal was originally slated to remain post-transition) to VHF channel 11 (the former allocation of WPXI's analog signal). Through the use of PSIP, digital television receivers display the station's virtual channel as its former UHF analog channel 19. Interference with Cleveland CBS affiliate WOIO that existed when both stations operated analog signals is no longer an issue as that station is broadcasting its digital signal on VHF channel 10. In July 2009, the station applied with the FCC for a repeater digital signal on channel 27 in Johnstown.

Translator

WPCW was previously relayed on WBPA-LP in Pittsburgh (owned by Venture Technologies Group) from the days when it did not have a strong signal throughout the city.

References

External links

The CW affiliates
Grit (TV network) affiliates
Heroes & Icons affiliates
Circle (TV network) affiliates
CBS News and Stations
Television stations in Pittsburgh
PCW
Television channels and stations established in 1953
Low-power television stations in the United States
1953 establishments in Pennsylvania